Historic Sites of South Korea are South Korean cultural heritages at state-level, designated by the Cultural Heritage Administration of Korea, for places and facilities of great historic and academic values that are specially commemorable. It is notifiable that structures built from the late 19th century to the 1940s are not eligible for listing as "Historic Sites", but rather may be officially listed as 'Cultural Heritage of early modern Times' among 'Registered Cultural Heritage', "if they are highly valuable and on the verge of destruction or deterioration".

Overview 
Historic Sites of South Korea is designated by the Administrator of the Cultural Heritage Administration, under article 25 of 'Cultural Heritage Protection Act' of South Korea. Below table is list of Historic Sites of South Korea until February 2017. Missing numbers in each table indicates such designation have been cancelled later.

List of Historic Sites

Designation number from 1 - 100

Designation number from 101 - 200

Designation number from 201 - 300

Designation number from 301 - 400

Designation number from 401 - 500

Designation number from 501 - 600

See also

 Heritage preservation in South Korea
 National Museum of Korea
 National Treasures of South Korea
 Important Intangible Cultural Properties of Korea

References

External links
  Historic Sites of South Korea official search page
  Historic Sites of South Korea official search page

 
Heritage registers in South Korea